This is a list of bridges and tunnels on the National Register of Historic Places in the U.S. state of Louisiana.

References

 
Louisiana
Bridges
Bridges